Pierre-Claude Drouin (born April 22, 1974) is a former Canadian professional ice hockey left winger who played for the Boston Bruins, various teams in Europe, and the Fort Wayne Komets of the Central Hockey League.

Playing career
As a youth, Drouin played in the 1987 Quebec International Pee-Wee Hockey Tournament with a minor ice hockey team from Saint-Jean-sur-Richelieu.

Drouin played for Cornell University Big Red in the NCAA, and has represented a number of professional hockey teams. He has played 3 NHL games for the Boston Bruins in the 1996–97 NHL season, scoring no points.

He was signed by the Bruins from Cornell University as a free agent and had spells in the American Hockey League with the Providence Bruins and the ECHL for the Charlotte Checkers.  In 1998, he moved to the United Kingdom to play in the now-defunct British Ice Hockey Superleague for the Bracknell Bees, where he won the Superleague title in 1999-2000.  He then moved to the Nottingham Panthers in a two-year spell which saw him lead the team in points both seasons.  He then played in Germany's Deutsche Eishockey Liga for the Augsburger Panther and then in Finland's SM-liiga for JYP and Jokerit.

He returned to America and joined the Fort Wayne Komets of the United Hockey League in an impressive two-year spell which saw him [score 24 goals and 50 assists for 74 points in both seasons.  He then spent a season with the Hockey Club de Morzine Avoriaz in France as a player/assistant coach, before returning to the Nottingham Panthers as a player/assistant coach in 2007. After being released by Nottingham mid-season, Drouin returned home to Fort Wayne, where he helped the Fort Wayne Komets win the Turner Cup in a dramatic final in 2008. He returned to the Fort Wayne Komets for the third straight year.

Career statistics

Regular season and playoffs

References

External links

1974 births
Living people
Augsburger Panther players
Boston Bruins players
Canadian expatriate ice hockey players in England
Canadian expatriate ice hockey players in Finland
Canadian expatriate ice hockey players in France
Canadian expatriate ice hockey players in Germany
Canadian ice hockey left wingers
Charlotte Checkers (1993–2010) players
Cornell Big Red men's ice hockey players
Fort Wayne Komets players
HC Morzine-Avoriaz players
Ice hockey people from Quebec
Ice Hockey Superleague players
Jokerit players
Nottingham Panthers players
Providence Bruins players
Undrafted National Hockey League players